The assault on the Branch of Banco Espírito Santo of Campolide in Lisbon, which occurred on August 7, 2008, was one of the most mediated criminal cases in the history of Portugal. This case came against the background of a wave of violent crime against various services such as banks, gas stations and jewelry stores in the Greater Lisbon region in 2008.

On August 7, 2008, two assailants of Brazilian nationality, Wellington Nazaré and Nilson Souza, starred in one of the most media assaults in Portugal. They took over the dependence of Banco Espírito Santo of Campolide, kidnapping six people: two men and four women including two agency employees, manager Ana Antunes and deputy manager Vasco Mendes. A statement transmitted at 1:00 a.m. by Special Operations Group superintendent Florbela Carrilho, confirms that the two men entered armed in the bank by 3 p.m. After several hours of unsuccessful trading attempts, the special operations group was forced to intervene. A team of special shooters shot the two kidnappers with precision shots from a distance. Nilson was shot and died immediately; Wellington suffered very serious injuries, but survived. The two bank employees were unharmed.

Preparations for the operation
Portuguese police rapid intervention forces removed all vehicles parked in the area and also remain closed nearby establishments, with traffic interrupted. Several emergency medical assistance vehicles and health personnel equipped with bulletproof vests were also mobilized, local media confirmed.

See also
List of hostage crises
List of bank robberies

References

2008 in Portugal
Robberies in Europe
2008 crimes in Portugal